Foss Island Power Station, also known as York Power Station, was a small 40 MW coal-fired power station serving the city of York.

It was located in the Layerthorpe area of the city, to the east of the city centre.

It was built by York Corporation in the 1890s, opened in February 1900 and closed on 25 October 1976.

History 
In 1923 the station was supplying 3-phase AC at 400 and 230 V; DC at 460 and 230 V; and DC for traction at 500 V. The steam turbine driven AC generators comprised two 1,250 kW and two 3,500 kW machines. DC current was produced by two 500 kW oil-driven machines. Electricity supplies were supplemented by a water powered generating station near Linton-on-Ouse (Linton Lock Hydro), which was commissioned in 1923 and comprised a 250 kW and a 500 kW generator. In 1923 the facilities at York generated 15.128 GWh of electricity. The sales of electricity produced a surplus of revenue over expenses of £26,938 for the Corporation.

Boiler Explosion - 1949 
On 27 October 1949 at 4.23 a.m. the No. 1 Low Pressure Boiler exploded. This took place on the centre mid drum which ripped along its longitudinal seam. Sections were blown 50 yards away.

The rear boiler section and economiser were blown into the turbine hall causing 35 and 20 ton overhead cranes to collapse, writing off a 3,500 KW turbo alternator and 1,000 KW motor generator set.

The south end of the boiler house was completely wrecked.

Power was restored to York 9.20 p.m. from the remaining generator sets the same day.

Partial demolition of the station building was followed by reconstruction which was completed by August 1950.

The turbine house was in full working order by January 1951

Plant specification 
The steam plant at Foss Island were chain grate stoker boilers capable of delivering 400,000 lb/h (50.4 kg/s) of steam at 400 psi (27.6 bar) and 399/427 °C. The generating capacity of the station was 40 MW. Steam condensing and cooling was by river water and a single concrete cooling tower. In the year ending 31 March 1972 the station delivered 54.772 GWh of electricity, its load factor (the average load as a percent of maximum output capacity) was 16.4 percent.

The electricity output from the station, in GWh, was as follows.
In 1958 the York electricity district supplied an area of 166,179 acres and a population of 152,269. The amount of electricity sold and the number and types of consumers was as follows:

In 1958 the above totals were made up of the following: 

The buildings were demolished around 1980 and the transmission line which ran from the power station to a substation at Tang Hall Lane was dismantled at around the same time.

References

Coal-fired power stations in England
Power stations in Yorkshire and the Humber
Former power stations in England
Buildings and structures in York